Georges Welbes (born 11 June 1944) is a Luxembourgian former swimmer. He competed in the men's 100 metre freestyle at the 1964 Summer Olympics.

References

1944 births
Living people
Luxembourgian male freestyle swimmers
Olympic swimmers of Luxembourg
Swimmers at the 1964 Summer Olympics
Sportspeople from Luxembourg City